Kim Ye-lim or Kim Ye-rim may refer to:

 Kim Ye-lim (born 2003), South Korean figure skater
 Lim Kim (born 1994), South Korean singer for Togeworl, born Kim Ye-rim
 Yeri (singer) (born 1999), South Korean singer for Red Velvet, born Kim Ye-rim